John Moses Cheney (January 6, 1859 – June 2, 1922) was a Florida attorney and a United States district judge of the United States District Court for the Southern District of Florida. A Republican, Cheney represented African American clients during the segregation era and supported voter registration drives during his U.S. Senate campaign in the era of white supremacy supported by the Democratic Party in Florida and across the south. Efforts to register African Americans resulted in the Ocoee massacre.

Education and career

Born on January 6, 1859, in Milwaukee, Wisconsin, Cheney received a Bachelor of Laws in 1885 from the Boston University School of Law. He entered private practice in Orlando, Florida from 1886 to 1906. He was city attorney for Orlando from 1889 to 1890. He was a Supervisor for the United States Census for Florida in 1900. He was the owner of the Orlando Light and Water Company from 1901 to 1922. He was the United States Attorney for the Southern District of Florida from 1906 to 1912.

Federal judicial service

Cheney received a recess appointment from President William Howard Taft on August 26, 1912, to a seat on the United States District Court for the Southern District of Florida vacated by Judge James William Locke. He was nominated to the same position by President Taft on December 3, 1912. His service terminated on March 3, 1913, after his nomination was not confirmed by the United States Senate, which never held a vote on his nomination.

Later career and death

Cheney resumed private practice in Orlando from 1913 to 1922. He died on June 2, 1922, in Orlando.

See also
 Ocoee massacre

References

Sources
 

1859 births
1922 deaths
People from Orlando, Florida
Lawyers from Milwaukee
Florida lawyers
Judges of the United States District Court for the Southern District of Florida
Boston University School of Law alumni
Unsuccessful recess appointments to United States federal courts
United States district court judges appointed by William Howard Taft
20th-century American judges
United States Attorneys for the Southern District of Florida